Jack Robert Culcay-Keth (born 26 September 1985) is an Ecuadorian-born German professional boxer. As an amateur he represented Germany, fighting at the 2008 Summer Olympics in the welterweight division, and winning a silver medal at the 2008 European Championships and gold at the 2009 World Championships. He held the WBA interim light-middleweight title between 2015 and 2017.

Amateur career
Culcay took up boxing at the behest of his father in 1998, training at TG 75 Darmstadt. He was relatively unknown in 2007, when he was sent to the 2007 World Amateur Boxing Championships. But while all the German top fighters exited early he and middleweight Konstantin Buga were the only ones to reach the quarterfinal and qualify for the 2008 Summer Olympics. At the World Championships, Culcay beat Jetmir Kuci and Zoran Mitrovic then he lost to eventual American winner Demetrius Andrade. At the Olympics he was edged out in his first bout by Kim Jung-Joo. Culcay went on to win a gold medal at the 2009 World Championships, beating Andrey Zamkovoy in the final match.

Professional career
Culcay turned pro in 2009. He is promoted by Sauerland Promotions. He won his first 14 fights, before losing a split decision to Guido Pitto. Culcay avenged the loss with a narrow unanimous decision win in his next fight. Culcay claimed the European light-middleweight title in August 2014, beating Isaac Real on points.

Culcay vs. Weber 
In May 2015, Culcay faced Maurice Weber for the WBA interim light-middleweight title. Culcay won the bout and the title by unanimous decision.

Culcay vs. Andrade 
After two successful defenses, Culcay reached an agreement to fight former world champion Demetrius Andrade. The winner would be elevated to WBA (Regular) champion. The fight took place in March 2017 at the Friedrich-Ebert-Halle in Ludwigshafen, Germany. Andrade won by split decision. Two judges scored the bout 116–112, 116–112 for Andrade whilst the third had it 115–114 for Culcay. The fight was regarded as close, with as many as five rounds being tossed between the two. Sky Sports pundits had Andrade a clear close winner as he outworked Culcay. In the post fight interview, Andrade credited his performance, "I thought I did everything that I needed to do. I came to Germany and took the title. Culcay came like a champion, but I was the better man. I outlanded him and I came out with the victory."

Culcay vs. Cospolite 
On June 12, 2020, Culcay fought Howard Cospolite. While Cospolite performed well in some rounds of the bout, Culcay was overall more efficient and managed to outland Cospolite. This deserved Culcay a unanimous decision win, scoring 118-110, 117-111 and 116-112 on the scorecards.

Culcay vs. Baraou 
In his next bout, Culcay faced IBF #7-ranked and WBC #13-ranked Abass Baraou. In a very close fight, Culcay managed to do enough to win the but in the eyes of two of the judges, who scored the fight 116-113 and 115-114 in favor of Culcay while the third judge saw Baraou as the winner 115-113, result in a split-decision win for the former world champion.

Professional boxing record 

{|class="wikitable" style="text-align:center; font-size:95%"
|-
!
!Result
!Record
!Opponent
!Type
!Round, time
!Date
!Location
!Notes
|-
|33
|Win
|29–4
|align=left| Abass Baraou
|SD
|12
|28 Aug 2020
|align=left|
|
|-
|32
|Win
|28–4
|align=left| Howard Cospolite
|UD
|12
|12 Jun 2020
|align=left|
|align=left|
|-
|31
|Win
|27–4
|align=left| Jama Saidi
|UD
|12
|23 Nov 2019
|align=left|
|align=left|
|-
|30
|Win
|26–4
|align=left| Stefano Castellucci
|UD
|8
|15 Jun 2019
|align=left| 
|
|- 
|29
|Loss
|25–4
|align=left| Sergiy Derevyanchenko
|UD
|12
|13 Apr 2019
|align=left| 
|
|-
|28
|Win
|25–3
|align=left| Rafael Bejaran
|TKO
|10 (12)
|22 Sep 2018
|align=left| 
|align=left|
|- 
|27
|Win
|24–3
|align=left| Adasat Rodriguez
|TKO
|6 (12) 
|9 Jun 2018
|align=left|
|style="text-align:left;"|
|-
|26
|Win
|23–3
|align=left| Craig Cunningham
|UD
|8
|10 Mar 2018
|align=left|
|
|-
|25
|Loss
|22–3
|align=left| Maciej Sulęcki
|UD
|10
|22 Oct 2017
|align=left|
|
|-
|24
|Loss
|22–2
|align=left| Demetrius Andrade
|SD
|12
|11 Mar 2017
|align=left|
|align=left|
|-
|23
|Win
|22–1
|align=left| Jean Carlos Prada
|RTD
|9 (12), 
|9 Apr 2016
|align=left|
|align=left|
|-
|22
|Win
|21–1
|align=left| Dennis Hogan
|UD
|12
|5 Dec 2015
|align=left|
|align=left|
|-
|21
|Win
|20–1
|align=left| Maurice Weber
|UD
|12
|9 May 2015
|align=left|
|align=left|
|-
|20
|Win
|19–1
|align=left| Karim Merroudj
|UD
|12
|6 Dec 2014
|align=left|
|align=left|
|-
|19
|Win
|18–1
|align=left| Isaac Real
|UD
|12
|16 Aug 2014
|align=left|
|align=left|
|-
|18
|Win
|17–1
|align=left| Salim Larbi
|UD
|12
|05 Apr 2014
|align=left|
|align=left|
|-
|17
|Win
|16–1
|align=left| Dieudonne Belinga
|UD
|12
|14 Dec 2013
|align=left|
|align=left|
|-
|16
|Win
|15–1
|align=left| Guido Nicolas Pitto
|UD
|12
|26 Oct 2013
|align=left|
|align=left|
|-
|15
|Loss
|14–1
|align=left| Guido Nicolas Pitto
|SD
|12
|27 Apr 2013
|align=left|
|align=left|
|-
|14
|Win
|14–0
|align=left| Jean Michel Hamilcaro
|TKO
|5 (12) 
|15 Dec 2012
|align=left|
|align=left|
|-
|13
|Win
|13–0
|align=left| Mark Thompson 
|TKO
|5 (12) 
|29 Sep 2012
|align=left|
|align=left|
|-
|12
|Win
|12–0
|align=left| Frederic Serre
|TKO
|3 (12) 
|25 Aug 2012
|align=left|
|align=left|
|-
|11
|Win
|11–0
|align=left| Salvatore Annunziata
|TKO
|7 (8) 
|25 Feb 2012
|align=left|
|
|-
|10
|Win
|10–0
|align=left| Giammario Grassellini
|KO
|1 (10) 
|3 Dec 2011
|align=left|
|
|- 
|9
|Win
|9–0
|align=left| Dee Mitchell
|UD
|10
|3 Sep 2011
|align=left|
|
|-
|8
|Win
|8–0
|align=left| Mikheil Khutsishvili
|KO
|3 (8) 
|9 Apr 2011
|align=left|
|
|-
|7
|Win
|7–0
|align=left| Alexey Ribchev
|UD
|8
|19 Nov 2010
|align=left|
|
|-
|6
|Win
|6–0
|align=left| Ionut Trandafir Ilie
|TKO
|4 (6) 
|31 Jul 2010
|align=left|
|
|-
|5
|Win
|5–0
|align=left| Omar Siala
|UD
|6
|3 Jul 2010
|align=left|
|
|-
|4
|Win
|4–0
|align=left| Isak Tavares
|TKO
|1 (6) 
|22 May 2010
|align=left|
|
|-
|3
|Win
|3–0
|align=left| Sylvestre Marianini
|TKO
|1 (4) 
|24 Apr 2010
|align=left|
|
|-
|2
|Win
|2–0
|align=left| Dmitrij Sidorovic
|TKO
|1 (4) 
|9 Jan 2010
|align=left|
|
|-
|1
|Win
|1–0
| align=left| Jindrich Kubin
|UD
|4
|19 Dec 2009
|align=left|
|

References

External links

 All results
 Jack Culcay - Profile, News Archive & Current Rankings at Box.Live

|-

1985 births
Living people
People from Ambato, Ecuador
Welterweight boxers
Boxers at the 2008 Summer Olympics
Olympic boxers of Germany
German male boxers
AIBA World Boxing Championships medalists